The 9th Politburo of the Chinese Communist Party was elected at the 1st Plenary Session of the 9th Central Committee on April 28, 1969 and sat in session until August 1973, consisting of 21 members and 4 alternate members. It met for four years, during the middle of the politically insoluble Cultural Revolution.  It had been preceded by the 8th Politburo of the Chinese Communist Party.

Members (21) 
 Mao Zedong, Chairman of the Party Central Committee and member of the Politburo Standing Committee
 Lin Biao, Vice Chairman of the Party Central Committee and member of the Politburo Standing Committee (died in September 1971)
 Zhou Enlai, member of the Politburo Standing Committee
 Chen Boda, member of the Politburo Standing Committee (fell from power in September 1970; dismissed in August 1973)
 Kang Sheng, member of the Politburo Standing Committee

 Others in stroke order of surnames:
Ye Qun (wife of Lin Biao, died in September 1971)
Ye Jianying
Liu Bocheng
Jiang Qing (wife of Mao Zedong)
Zhu De
Xu Shiyou
Chen Xilian
Li Xiannian
Li Zuopeng (arrested in September 1971; dismissed in August 1973)
Wu Faxian (arrested in September 1971; dismissed in August 1973)
Zhang Chunqiao
Qiu Huizuo (arrested in September 1971; dismissed in August 1973)
Yao Wenyuan
Huang Yongsheng (arrested in September 1971; dismissed in August 1973)
Dong Biwu
Xie Fuzhi (died in March 1972)

Alternate members (4)
Ji Dengkui
Li Xuefeng (fell from power in January 1971; dismissed in August 1973)
Li Desheng
Wang Dongxing

References

External links 
  Gazette of the 1st Session of the 9th CCP Central Committee

Politburo of the Chinese Communist Party
1969 in China